Nowsher-ye Koshk-e Bijar Rural District is a rural district (dehestan) in Khoshk-e Bijar District, Rasht County, Gilan Province, Iran. At the 2006 census, its population was 10,600, in 3,033 families. The rural district has 21 villages.

References 

Rural Districts of Gilan Province
Rasht County